Dianne Louise Gayler (born 9 June 1948) is a former Australian politician who represented the South Australian House of Assembly seat of Newland for the Labor Party from 1985 to 1989.

References

Members of the South Australian House of Assembly
1948 births
Living people
Australian Labor Party members of the Parliament of South Australia
Women members of the South Australian House of Assembly